"Too Late" is a song by Canadian singer the Weeknd from his fourth studio album After Hours. It was released on March 20, 2020, alongside the rest of its parent album. A music video for the song was released on October 22, 2020. The Weeknd co-wrote the song with its producers, Illangelo, DaHeala, and Ricky Reed, with additional production credits going to Nate Mercereau.

Background and release
The song was first teased in the Weeknd's After Hours short film (released early March 2020) during a scene in which Tesfaye adjusts his nose bandage after leaving the Jimmy Kimmel Live! studio. The studio version of the song was then released on March 20, 2020, alongside the rest of the album.

Lyrics
The lyrics of the song depict a dysfunctional and hedonistic relationship the Weeknd had with a former lover, with him apologizing for the mistakes he's made throughout their romance.

Critical reception
"Too Late" was met with widespread universal acclaim. According to the Billboard, the song was ranked the second best song from the After Hours album behind "Save Your Tears", stating: The throbbing electro-R&B beats bring Tesfaye’s apologetic musings to another level (“I let you down, I led you on,” he sings). The Halloween-esque chords and the song’s eventual and literal unplugging is an electric combination that gives way to the next energetic track, “Hardest to Love.”.

Music video
The official music video for "Too Late" was first teased by the Weeknd as being on its way (alongside those for "Escape from LA" and "Faith") through his Rolling Stone interview with Brittany Spanos on September 18, 2020. This was then later followed up on October 13, 2020, where he further hinted on its music video being on its way through several posts on his social media platforms. Tesfaye then officially announced its release date through social media, a day prior to its release, on October 21, 2020. The visual was released on October 22, 2020, and was directed by Cliqua. It serves as the sequel to the music video of "In Your Eyes" and features heavily bandaged models Ashley Smith and Kenzie Harr finding the decapitated head of the Weeknd and transplanting onto the body of singer Ken XY in a gory and murderous manner.

as the year 2021, this video is age restricted on YouTube due to its graphic violence and gore

Commercial performance
Following the releasing of its parent album, "Too Late" debuted at number 28 on the US Billboard Hot 100 dated April 4, 2020. It was the eighth-highest charting track from After Hours.

Personnel
Credits adapted from Tidal. 
 The Weeknd – vocals, songwriting, production, keyboards, programming
 Illangelo – songwriting, production, keyboards, programming
 DaHeala – songwriting, production, keyboards, programming
 Ricky Reed – songwriting, production, keyboards, programming

Charts

Release history

References

External links
 

2020 songs
The Weeknd songs
Songs written by the Weeknd
Song recordings produced by the Weeknd
Songs written by DaHeala
Songs written by Illangelo
Songs written by Ricky Reed